Mt. Carmel Historic District is a national historic district located near Marshall, Saline County, Missouri.  The district encompasses two contributing buildings and two contributing sites near Marshall. The district consists of the Gothic Revival style Mt. Carmel Methodist Church (1893) (destroyed in a fire 2012), the church cemetery, the nearby Queen Anne style Brown-Dyer House (1891), and the surrounding farm acreage.

It was listed on the National Register of Historic Places in 2009.

References

Historic districts on the National Register of Historic Places in Missouri
Queen Anne architecture in Missouri
Gothic Revival architecture in Missouri
Buildings and structures in Saline County, Missouri
National Register of Historic Places in Saline County, Missouri